In social media, a wife guy is a man whose fame is owed to the content he posts about his wife. The term has been applied more broadly to men who use their wife to upgrade their social standing or public persona.

History 

The term was first coined for Internet memes about wives, notably a much-parodied "Email to my girlfriend's husband" circulating in 2016. Robbie Tripp, an American whose Instagram post of himself with his wife went viral in 2017, was dubbed the "curvy wife guy" by the media, spawning many imitators. The concept became more widely known in 2019, when several leading U.S. media outlets published articles about it.

The phenomenon has been traced back to before the term was coined. Many media outlets identify dril, a Weird Twitter account, as pioneering the trope online. Dril is noted for making posts relating various things his fictional wife does that make him seem pathetic, like withholding his inhaler or keeping him from purchasing a harp. In a chapter of his book Dril Official "Mr. Ten Years" Anniversary Collection called "Wife", he details various ruses to thwart his ex-wife.

Meghan Roberts in Slate argued that Antoine Lavoisier was a wife guy, especially due to the notable portrait of him and his wife, where his wife Marie-Anne is the focus of the painting. His wife promoted his research above his competitors, and lent a public face to his work, which could be difficult to explain to a general audience. It is argued that Lavoisier was using his wife's image to build his personal brand. The New Yorker identifies post-women's liberation literary fiction as perpetuating it as a trope, with titles like The Time Traveler's Wife and The Zookeeper's Wife, books that were later made into films in the 21st century. The article identifies these titles and the meme itself as a being a form of erasure, where the nature of the wife guy erases the wife he derives his fame from.

In 2013, a Reddit post of a garage tagged in red spray-paint with "Don't e-mail my wife!!!" emerged on the Internet. The obscurity of the wife was noted as being similar to the wife guy trope in retrospect.

Assessments 
The New York Times compared wife guys to incels, who define themselves by their inability to find a partner, in that wife guys define themselves by having found one, and expect to be congratulated for it. The paper also considered the "wife guy" phenomenon to reflect the changed status of marriage from societal default to personal achievement. Similarly, MEL Magazine wrote that wife guys treated their wives as "legitimizing for a male web celebrity", and as "a measure of the husband’s influence". Some outlets have argued that public figures and politicians often seek to be seen as a wife guy, in order to be seen as trustworthy and non-threatening.

References

Social media
Internet memes introduced in 2016
Social psychology
2016 neologisms
Internet slang
Marriage